Club Deportivo Ingeniería is a Peruvian football club, based in the city of Huancayo, of the Junín Region in Peru.

History
In the 2006 Copa Perú, the club classified to the National Stage. They eliminated Sport Victoria of Ica in the round of 16 and Sport Huamanga of Ayacucho in the quarterfinals. However, the club was defeated by eventual champions, Total Clean, in the semifinals.

Honours

Regional
Región VI:
Runner-up (1): 2006

Liga Departamental de Junín:
Winners (1): 2006

Liga Provincial de Huancayo:
Winners (1): 2006
Runner-up (1): 2007

Liga Distrital de Huancayo:
Winners (2): 2006, 2011
Runner-up (1): 2015

See also
List of football clubs in Peru
Peruvian football league system

External links
 Official Website

Football clubs in Peru
Association football clubs established in 2002